5-nitroanthranilic acid aminohydrolase (naaA (gene), 5NAA deaminase) is an enzyme with systematic name 5-nitroanthranilate amidohydrolase. This enzyme catalyses the following chemical reaction

 5-nitroanthranilate + H2O  5-nitrosalicylate + NH3

The enzyme is present in Bradyrhizobium sp. strain JS329.

References

External links 
 

EC 3.5.99